Rose VL Deli is a Vietnamese restaurant in Portland, Oregon.

Description

Rose VL Deli is a Vietnamese restaurant in southeast Portland's Foster-Powell neighborhood. The restaurant is located in a strip mall and the interior has been described as "cheerfully purple-and-white".

The menu includes noodles (including cao lầu), soups, bánh mì, and coffee (including Vietnamese iced coffee). Soup options vary depending on the day; varieties include chicken curry, crabflake, fishcake, and turmeric noodle.

History
Christina Ha Luu and William Vuoung opened Rose VL Deli in 2015. The restaurant began serving lunch in 2016. In 2019, Rose VL Deli began operating on Sundays and not on Thursdays. The restaurant operated via take-out at times, during the COVID-19 pandemic.

Rose VL Deli is related to Ha VL, opened by the same owners in 2004. In 2019, the couple confirmed plans to open a third restaurant in Beaverton.

Reception
Rose VL Deli was named the city's best soup shop in Portland Monthly "Best New Restaurants of 2015" list.  The magazine included the cao lȃ̀u in a 2022 list of "The 12 Best Breakfasts in Portland".

In 2018, Eater Portland Brooke Jackson-Glidden called Rose VL Deli the city's best Vietnamese restaurant. In 2019, the website's Nick Woo called the cao lầu "iconic" and wrote: "The heady stew of wonderfully contrasting textures and flavors has earned this place many regulars." He also included the chicken curry soup in Eater Portland 2019 list of "13 Stellar Curries in Portland". Jackson-Glidden included the restaurant in a 2021 list of Portland's "38 essential restaurants and food carts". She and Mattie John Bamman included the cao lầu in Eater Portland 2021 list of "15 Iconic Portland Dishes and Drinks".See also

 List of Vietnamese restaurants

References

External links
 Rose VL at Portland Monthly''

2015 establishments in Oregon
Foster-Powell, Portland, Oregon
Restaurants established in 2015
Vietnamese restaurants in Portland, Oregon